Mikhail Vadimovich Shchetinin (born 8 July 2005) is a Russian footballer who plays as a midfielder for FC Lokomotiv Moscow.

Club career
Shchetinin made his debut for FC Lokomotiv Moscow on 27 November 2022 in a Russian Cup game against FC Pari Nizhny Novgorod. He made his Russian Premier League debut for Lokomotiv on 18 March 2023 against FC Krasnodar.

Career statistics

References

External links
 
 
 
 

Living people
2005 births
Sportspeople from Kursk
Russian footballers
Association football midfielders
Russia youth international footballers
FC Lokomotiv Moscow players
Russian Premier League players